Kau To Hang is a river in Sha Tin District, New Territories, Hong Kong. Its source starts near Cheung Lek Mei, inside Tai Po Kau Nature Reserve. It flows eastward past Nim Au, Ma Niu, Kau To, collecting minor streams on the way. Finally, it empties into Sha Tin Hoi, part of Tolo Harbour.

See also
List of rivers and nullahs in Hong Kong

References
2006. Hong Kong Driving Guide. Universal Publications Ltd.

External links

Rivers of Hong Kong

Rivers of Hong Kong
Tai Po